Etihad Etisalat Company is a Saudi Arabian telecommunications services company that offers fixed line, mobile telephony, and Internet services under the brand name Mobily.

The company was established in 2004, and in the summer of that year, won the bid for Saudi Arabia's second GSM licence. Mobily launched mobile services in Saudi Arabia on 5 May 2005, breaking Saudi Telecom's monopoly in the wireless business.

History
Etihad Etisalat Co. was incorporated as a joint stock company under royal decree no. M/40 dated 18 August 2004. The company won the bid for Saudi Arabia's second GSM licence in the summer of 2004. The licence is valid for 25 years. Etihad Etisalat began its constituent activities on 14 December 2004 upon the publication of its incorporation.

United Arab Emirates firm Etisalat holds a 27.45% stake in the company, the General Organization for Social Insurance (GOSI) holds 11.85% and the rest is held by other investors and by public shares. Etisalat Etihad held an Initial public offering in October 2004 that was massively oversubscribed (30 times). Police had to be called in to respond to unrest among investors fighting over application forms.

The GSM Associations "GSM Association Newsletter" Dec. 2004 edition described Mobily as the fastest growing mobile operator in the Middle East & North Africa. In 2006, Mobily reached more than 4,800,000 subscribers.  As of 20 January 2007, mobily had 6 million subscribers and 0.5 million 3G users.

Etihad Etisalat launched GSM mobile services under the brand name Mobily on 5 May 2005, breaking the Saudi Telecom Company's monopoly in the wireless business. The company had spent 6 months preparing for the launch, and acquired 1 million subscribers within the first 90 days of launch.

The company launched 3.5G services on 27 June 2006 and 4G services on 13 September 2011.

After 10 years of managing Mobily's services, in February 2021, Nokia extended its partnership with Mobily and signed a 3-year agreement that allows it to manage and maintain the radio and transport networks in Riyadh and other regions.

In May 2013, it was reported that Mobily is working on a way to intercept encrypted data sent over the Internet by Twitter, Viber, WhatsApp, and other mobile apps, and to bypass the protections built into the SSL and Transport Layer Security protocols.

Network technology

Radio frequency summary

See also
 Bayanat Al Oula for Network Services
 Communication in Saudi Arabia
 Censorship in Saudi Arabia

References

External links
 

2004 establishments in Saudi Arabia
Telecommunications companies established in 2004
Companies of Saudi Arabia
Companies listed on Tadawul
Companies based in Riyadh
Mobile phone companies of Saudi Arabia
Saudi Arabian brands
Etisalat